Wiener is a surname. People with the surname include: 

 Alexander S. Wiener (1907–1976), forensic medicine, serology, and immunogenetics
 Alfred Wiener (1885–1964), German Jewish campaigner against Nazism and anti-semitism
 Anna Wiener, American writer
 Charles Wiener (1851–1913), Austrian-French scientist-explorer
 Christian Wiener (1826–1896), German mathematician
 Daniel Wiener (born 1954), American sculptor
 Deanna Wiener (born 1953), American politician
 Ellen Wiener (born 1954), American artist
 Frederick Bernays Wiener (1906–1996), American jurist
 Gabriela Wiener (born 1975), Peruvian writer, chronicler, poet, and journalist
 Harry Wiener (1924–1998), American chemist
 Hermann Wiener (1857–1939), German mathematician
 Jacques Wiener (1815–1899), Belgian Jewish-Flemish engraver
 Jacques L. Wiener Jr. (born 1934), American judge
 Jean Wiener (1896–1982), French pianist, composer
 Joel Wiener (born 1948/49), American billionaire real estate developer and landlord
 Jonathan B. Wiener, law professor
 Jon Wiener (born 1944), American professor of history
 Josh Keaton (born Joshua Luis Wiener; born 1979), American actor, singer, and music producer
 Julien Wiener (born 1955), Australian cricketer
 L. H. Wiener (born 1945), Dutch writer
 Leigh Wiener (1929–1993), American photographer and photojournalist
 Leo Wiener (1862–1939), American historian, linguist, author, and translator of Leo Tolstoy's collected works
 Malcolm H. Wiener (born 1935), Aegean prehistorian and philanthropist
 Mark Wiener (1951–2012), American abstract painter
 Martin Wiener (born 1941), American political historian and author
 Michael A. Wiener (1938–2009), American businessman
 Murray A. Wiener (1909–?), polar explorer and photographer
 Norbert Wiener (1894–1964), American mathematician
 Otto Wiener (baritone) (1913–2000), Austrian baritone
 Otto Wiener (physicist) (1862–1927), German physicist
 Paul Lester Wiener (1895–1967), American architect and urban planner
 Phyllis Wiener (1921–2013), American painter
 Renate Chasman (born Renate Wiener; 1932–1977), American physicist
 Robert Wiener (producer), CNN producer and author of Live from Baghdad
 Rosalie Roos Wiener (1899–1982), art student and an artist
 Rosalind Wiener Wyman (born 1930), American politician
 Scott Wiener (born 1970), American politician
 Valerie Wiener (born 1948), American politician
 Yehuda Wiener-Gafni (born 1930), Israeli basketball player
 Zvi Wiener, Israeli academic and economist

See also
 Wiener (disambiguation)

German-language surnames